The Ptsich, or Pcič  is a river in Eastern Europe. It flows south through Belarus, taking its source near Minsk, and draining into the Pripyat, being its left tributary.

Its biggest tributary is the Aresa.

References 

Rivers of Gomel Region
Rivers of Mogilev Region
Rivers of Minsk Region
Rivers of Belarus